Richard L. Jantz is an American anthropologist. He served as the director of the University of Tennessee Anthropological Research Facility from 1998–2011 and he is the current Professor Emeritus of the Department of Anthropology at the University of Tennessee, Knoxville. His research focuses primarily on forensic anthropology, skeletal biology, dermatoglyphics, anthropometry, anthropological genetics, and human variation, as well as developing computerized databases in these areas which aid in anthropological research.  The author of over a hundred journal articles and other publications, his research has helped lead and shape the field of physical and forensic anthropology for many years.

Among his students was Douglas W. Owsley.

Background 
Jantz spent his childhood and received his early education in a small town in central Kansas.  He attended a community college before attending the University of Kansas, where he took a class from noted anthropologist Dr. William M. Bass.  He received a Bachelor of Arts in Anthropology in 1962, a Master of Arts in Anthropology in 1964, and a Ph.D. in Anthropology in 1970, all from the University of Kansas.  He realized early on that his strengths lay in statistical analysis of measurements.

Research 
Some of Jantz’s more current research involves quantitative osteometric and anthropometric variation among Native American populations, including an analysis of the work of Franz Boas.

In the early 1900s, Boas conducted an anthropometric study showing the plasticity of the human body in response to environmental changes. Testing the skeletal measurements of children of immigrants to the US, he found that their measurements were closer to the American mean than to the mean of their home countries. Boas saw this as an argument that nutrition and environment was more important in determining body measurements than racial background, and his study was widely seen as discrediting racial anthropometry.

In 2002, Jantz conducted a reassessment of Boas' study, the first time anyone had examined the validity of Boas’ work. Specimens from Jantz’s research ranged in age from 10,000 years old to the modern period. In his reassessment, Jantz argued that Boas’ original claims about the variations in skeletal plasticity between European and American born children was flawed, stating that he could find only insignificant differences between European and American born children. He also argued that exposure to the environment in America did not affect the children's crania. Jantz claims that his work discredited that of Boas although his own study has received criticism.

Jonathan Marks – a well-known physical anthropologist and former president of the General Anthropology section of the American Anthropological Association – has remarked that this reassessment of Boas's work "has the ring of desperation to it (if not obfuscation), and has been quickly rebutted by more mainstream biological anthropology".

In 2003, anthropologists Clarence C. Gravlee, H. Russell Bernard, and William R. Leonard reanalyzed Boas's data and concluded that most of Boas's original findings were correct. Moreover, they applied new statistical, computer-assisted methods to Boas's data and discovered more evidence for cranial plasticity. In a later publication, Gravlee, Bernard and Leonard reviewed Sparks and Jantz's analysis. They argue that Sparks and Jantz misrepresented Boas's claims, and that Sparks's and Jantz's data actually support Boas.

For example, they point out that Sparks and Jantz look at changes in cranial size in relation to how long an individual has been in the United States in order to test the influence of the environment. Boas, however, looked at changes in cranial size in relation to how long the mother had been in the United States. They argue that Boas's method is more useful, because the prenatal environment is a crucial developmental factor.

His other research also includes looking at microevolutionary forces acting on Aleut and Eskimo populations of the Bering Sea using anthropometrics. Databases are currently being developed and maintained for research purposes by Jantz for students and faculty, which include  Boas anthropometrics which include body measurements on 15,000 BP Native Americans and 2,000 BP Siberians, Forensic-osteometric and other forensic data from 1,500 BP recent American skeletons, Heinz Brehme Dermatoglyphic Database which includes ridge-counts, pattern classifications on 50,000 BP people from most parts of the world, Plains osteometric cranial and postcranial morphometric data on 2,000 BP individuals from the Great Plains region, the Great Basin, the Southwest and Northwest.

Other recent research includes looking at mtDNA of three Arikara sites in South Dakota that were occupied between AD 1600 and 1832. Analysis from this research shows similarities between these people and other Native American groups. This suggests an admixing of these groups in recent times.  Another research project underway is the CT sexing project.  This project’s goal is to improve the ability to estimate sex from cranial bones; in the absence of the pelvis, professionals consider the skull the second best indicator of sex.  Currently, the accuracy lies between 85 and 90% for traditional sexing methods using cranial bones. The CT sexing project strives to increase this accuracy using CT scans of modern skeletal remains from the William Bass Donated Collection.  Using these specimens, Jantz has examined sexual dimorphism in greater detail than what can be accomplished through external measurements and observations.  This project is being funded by the National Institute of Justice and is being jointly conducted by the Department of Anthropology and the Department of Biomedical Engineering.

Jantz has also played a role in the scientific examination and legal challenge associated with the discovery of Kennewick Man found in Washington on the Columbia River in 1996 and radiocarbon dated to ca. 9,000 years old.  Jantz was one of eight anthropologists who sued the federal government to gain more access to Kennewick Man’s remains to study. Another project Jantz was involved with was the identification of crew from the Confederate submarine Hunley found off the coast of South Carolina using skeletal data and existing archaeological and genealogical records. Goals include determining the activities of the soldiers that took place on board, the length of time they were on the submarine, and any injuries, malnutrition, or illnesses they might have had.  The crew’s skeletons were well preserved, making it possible for scientists to do facial reconstructions to show what they might have looked like. Jantz has also been involved in studies reviewing conclusions and reexamining forensic evidence related to the Nikumaroro bones and whether they may belong to the missing aviator Amelia Earhart.

Awards 
Dr. Jantz was named a fellow of the American Association for the Advancement of Science for his distinguished contributions of database and software development to the field of biological anthropology. He received the Research and Creative Achievement Award from the University of Tennessee in 2003.

Major works

Papers and publications

References

External links

Living people
American anthropologists
People from Kansas
University of Tennessee faculty
University of Kansas alumni
Forensic anthropologists
Year of birth missing (living people)